MRE is a "Meal, Ready-to-Eat".

MRE may also refer to:

 European Republicans Movement (Movimento Repubblicani Europei), a tiny social-liberal political party in Italy
 Magnetic resonance elastography, a non-invasive medical imaging technique
 Magnetorheological elastomer, a class of solids that consist of a polymeric matrix with embedded micro- or nano-sized ferromagnetic particles
 Managed runtime environment, a type of virtual machine that runs as a normal application inside a host OS and supports one process
 Master of Religious Education, a terminal academic degree in preparation for professional teaching ministry
 Ministry of Foreign Affairs (Brazil) (Ministério das Relações Exteriores), the governmental body that conducts Brazil's foreign relations with other countries
 Maritime Republic of Eastport, a micronation in Maryland
 Minimal reproducible example, a software debugging technique